Piromalli is an Italian surname. Notable people with the surname include:

 Girolamo Piromalli (1918–1979), Italian mobster of the Piromalli 'ndrina
 Giuseppe Piromalli (disambiguation), several people

Italian-language surnames